Rula Lenska (born Róża Maria Leopoldyna Łubieńska, 30 September 1947) is a British actress. She mainly appears in British stage and television productions and is known in the United States for a series of television advertisements in the 1970s and 1980s. She is known for the films Queen Kong and Aura, and she portrayed Claudia Colby in the ITV soap opera Coronation Street.

Lenska was married to the actors Brian Deacon (1977–1987) and Dennis Waterman (1987–1998).

Early life

Lenska was born in England in the village of Diddington, near St Neots, Huntingdonshire, in a Polish resettlement camp that had previously been the EVAC American Military Hospital. Her birth was registered in nearby St Neots. Her family are members of the Polish nobility, bearing the Pomian coat of arms, and before the war owned a castle and estate in Kazimierza Wielka, Poland. Her father, Major Count Ludwik Łubieński, was personal secretary to Józef Beck, Minister for Foreign Affairs in Poland before the German occupation of the country. Later, he became adjutant to General Sikorski, Prime Minister of the Polish Government in Exile and chief of the Polish military mission in Gibraltar during World War II; during the Cold War he headed the CIA-funded Polish Section of Radio Free Europe in Germany. 

Her mother was Countess Elżbieta Tyszkiewicz, who escaped from Poland to Italy during the German occupation, but was captured with her own mother and sent to Ravensbrück concentration camp, where they survived for two years. Lenska has two sisters: Anna, an actress who appeared in films in the late-1950s and early-1960s, and Gabriela. Lenska was educated at the Ursuline Convent School in Westgate-on-Sea, Kent.

Early career
Lenska's big break was as the Little Ladies band member "Q" in the British TV series Rock Follies (1976) and its sequel, Rock Follies of '77, the following year. By this time, she had "discarded" her title as a Polish countess; she has said of the decision, "In England it doesn't count, if you'll excuse the pun."

In the late 1970s, Lenska began to appear in commercials for the hair product Alberto VO5, which were shown on US television. Though she was known in Britain, she was almost unknown in the United States. In a Tonight Show monologue broadcast after the commercials started running, Johnny Carson asked "Who the hell is Rula Lenska?" and began using her name as a running joke on his show. Around the same time, Jane Curtin played Lenska in a sketch on Saturday Night Live.

Television
Lenska has appeared in the television series Special Branch, Minder, Boon, The Detectives, Footballers' Wives, To the Manor Born, One Foot in the Grave, Casualty, Space: 1999, Return of the Saint, Robin of Sherwood, Doctors, and EastEnders, in which she played Frank Butcher's girlfriend, Krystle, in a 2002 Costa del Sol special. In the 1970s, Lenska made it to the final five actresses short-listed for the role of companion Jo Grant in Doctor Who, and she later appeared in the  serial Resurrection of the Daleks. She played Mrs. Peacock in series 2 of Cluedo.  She also starred with John Inman in the short-lived series Take a Letter, Mr. Jones (six episodes, 1981), with Lenska as an executive and Inman as her secretary. She was also featured in the BBC serial Private Schulz broadcast in the same year. 

In 1982 Lenska also appeared as a storyteller in five episodes of the BBC children's programme Jackanory, narrating traditional Polish folk tales. Lenska also starred in the black comedy Paradise Grove (2003). In 2009, Lenska joined the cast of Coronation Street as new character Claudia Colby, an old friend of Audrey Roberts. In May 2011, Lenska left the role to join the Calendar Girls tour in August 2011. In 2016, she appeared in a Christmas special episode of the comedy Inside No. 9.  She reprised her role in Coronation Street in July 2018, before leaving the show again in April 2020. Lenska returned as Claudia for Norris Cole's funeral in September 2021, and returned again in August 2022.

Film
Lenska's film roles have included Soft Beds, Hard Battles (1974), Confessions of a Pop Performer (1975), Royal Flash (1975), Alfie Darling (1975), It Could Happen to You (1976), The Deadly Females (1976), and Queen Kong (also 1976) as Luce Habit. In the film Gypo (2005), which was the first UK feature film to be made under Dogme rules, she played a Romani refugee from the Czech Republic living on a caravan site in Margate. She starred in the independent British film Jack Says (2008), opposite her one-time EastEnders co-star Mike Reid. That same year she lent her voice to the animation film Agent Crush.

Stage
Lenska has toured widely, both in the British Isles and overseas, and has appeared in several West End shows, including The Vagina Monologues and 84, Charing Cross Road, and also in many pantomimes. She is a regular performer (and part of the original cast) of the touring play Seven Deadly Sins Four Deadly Sinners.

In December 2005, she appeared on stage with the London Gay Men's Chorus for their Christmas Show, Make the Yuletide Gay. She sang and danced while also hosting the show at Symphony Hall in Birmingham, the Dome Concert Hall in Brighton and the Barbican Centre in London.

At the equivalent show in December 2006, Sandi Toksvig corrupted the lyrics of a song to suggest Lenska had a Christmas job in Debenhams. In 2007, she toured alongside Marti Webb and Sheila Ferguson in a new musical about menopause called Hot Flush. and hosted a mini-show at Lutterworth Piano Rooms 3 November 2012.

Radio and voice
On radio Lenska played Lintilla and her clones in the second series of The Hitchhiker's Guide to the Galaxy and was also in the fifth series which debuted on BBC Radio 4 in May 2005. She has presented travel programmes for BBC radio and has recorded various audiobooks.

Celebrity Big Brother

Lenska's work on tour with the London Gay Men's Chorus is assumed to have prompted her participation in the United Kingdom version of Celebrity Big Brother in January 2006. Her reason for accepting the invitation to go on the show was "I'm a crazy Polish countess who likes a challenge". During the show, she declared that she had been a "Tibetan Buddhist" for many years but had been practising "Buddhism for the common man", which has no hierarchical structure (Nichiren Daishonin), for two years.

On 13 January 2006, along with fellow housemate, Scottish politician and then-Respect Party MP George Galloway, she attracted the attention of the media by indulging in a role-play task set by Celebrity Big Brother, in which Galloway pretended to be a cat licking milk from her cupped hands, and Lenska stroked his ears and moustache. On another occasion during her time in the Big Brother house, she was accidentally locked in the toilet.

Personal life
Lenska has been married twice, first to actor Brian Deacon (4 June 1977 – 1987), with whom she had one daughter, Lara Parker (née Lara Deacon), and secondly, to actor Dennis Waterman, from 3 January 1987 until 31 March 1998. Both marriages ended in divorce. She and Waterman met on the set of Minder in 1981 where their characters had a brief love interest. Some years after Lenska's second marriage ended, in a March 2012 interview with Piers Morgan, Waterman said: "It's not difficult for a woman to make a man hit her. She certainly wasn't a beaten wife, she was hit and that’s different." Via her friend, Denise Welch on Loose Women, Lenska said that she was relieved that he had now admitted beating her. Lenska had made allegations against Waterman shortly after their split and thought she could no longer be accused of lying.

In 2016, Lenska was sentenced to a 16-month driving ban and ordered to pay a total of £526 after crashing her car while under the influence of alcohol. Her three-year-old grandson was a passenger in the car.

Filmography

Film

Television

See also
 Łubieński family
 Poles in the United Kingdom

References

External links
 
 
 Rock Follies interview
 E-Motion Magazine – Interview with Lenska
 Celebrity Big Brother — transcript of "cat" incident with Galloway
 
 

1947 births
Living people
Converts to Buddhism
English film actresses
English Buddhists
English television actresses
English stage actresses
English radio actresses
English soap opera actresses
English people of Polish descent
Officers of the Order of Polonia Restituta
People from St Neots
Actresses from Cambridgeshire
Polish nobility
Tibetan Buddhists from England